Portland is a port city in the U.S. state of Oregon located at the confluence of the Willamette and Columbia Rivers. Established in the 1830s as a camp along the Oregon Trail, Portland evolved into a major West Coast industrial city during the twentieth century. Contemporarily, it is the most populous city in Oregon, and the second-largest city in the Pacific Northwest.

This list of notable people includes persons who were either born in, are current residents of, or have lived in Portland. A person who lives in or comes from Portland, Oregon is called a Portlander.

A

B

C

D

E

F

G

H

I

J

K

L

M

N

O

P

R

S

T

U

V

W

Y

Z

References

Citations

Sources
 

Portland, Oregon
People, Portland
 
people